Majid Al Futtaim is an Emirati holding company based in Dubai. As of 2015, it owned and operated shopping malls, retail, and leisure establishments in the Middle East and North Africa with operations in 13 countries including UAE, Lebanon, Egypt, Saudi Arabia, Oman, Bahrain, Kuwait, Qatar, Jordan, Pakistan, Iraq, Armenia, Iran (through Hyperstar, a Carrefour subsidiary company), and Georgia. The group was established by Majid Al Futtaim in 1992 and manages three major operating subsidiaries: Majid Al Futtaim Properties, Majid Al Futtaim Retail, and Majid Al Futtaim Ventures. 

In 2016, the group has $10.6 billion in revenues and $760 million in profits.

History

In December 2018, group founder, Majid Al Futtaim was conferred the Royal Commendation Order by the Sultan of Oman, Qaboos bin Said al Said.

In December 2021, Majid Al Futtaim died in Dubai.

In September 2022, the company was listed by Forbes in the Middle East's Top 100 Arab Family Businesses, ranking sixth.

Majid Al Futtaim Properties
Majid Al Futtaim Properties develops, owns and manages shopping malls and hotels throughout the MENA region. The hotels business unit focuses on the development and asset management of hotels connected to or close to the company's shopping malls and within its master-planned communities. It owned and operated twelve hotels as of 2015. In 2017, Majid Al Futtaim Properties reported a profit of 2.19 billion dirhams ($596.25 million), down 7% on 2016.

Shopping malls 

Mall of the Emirates: located in Al Barsha on Sheikh Zayed Road in Dubai. Since its opening in 2005, the mall has become a main attraction in Dubai, welcome more than 42 million visitors annually. Mall includes more than 630 international stores.
Mall of Egypt : Opened in March 2017 and based in Sixth of October. The group is planning another shopping mall in Cairo.
Mall of Oman Located in Bousher on Muscat Expressway in Muscat
Mall of Saudi : in Riyadh, set to be completed by 2022.
Various city centre malls, like: 
City Centre Bahrain: Opened in 2008 in Manama (Bahrain).
Mirdif City Centre: Opened in 2010, in Dubai. 
City Centre Muscat: opened in 2001 in Muscat (Oman). Located on Sultan Qaboos Road (3 km from Muscat International Airport), Seeb, Muscat Governorate, Sultanate of Oman.  City Centre Muscat underwent an expansion in 2007 that doubled the size of the mall adding more than 60 new stores and increasing its retail space to 60,484 square meters. In June 2013, the mall announced a second redevelopment to add 48,500 square feet of retail space dedicated to entertainment and leisure.
Sohar City Centre: Scheduled to open in January 2019 in Muscat (Oman) on Al Batinah main road. Opening : January 2019. The mall is worth $117 million and contains 120 stores, a nine-screen VOX Cinemas, a 7,348 sqm Carrefour and other entertainment facilities. This project is part of the group's plans to reach $1.83 billion in investment by 2020 in Oman. Majid Al Futtaim has previously opened other shopping centers in Oman such as City Centre Muscat and My City Centre Sur.

Communities 
MAF aims at creating fully integrated communities which integrate Majid Al Futtaim’s residential, commercial, retail, leisure and entertainment facilities.

 Al Mouj Muscat: residential properties with green spaces, pedestrian walkways and inland waterways, retail and dining facilities, a 400-berth marina, and a golf course.
 Al Zahia: Mall scheduled for completion in 2020, final completion scheduled in 2023.
Waterfront City Business Park in Beirut, Lebanon. Scheduled for final completion in 2027.
Tilal Al Ghaf: Scheduled for completion in 2027.

Majid Al Futtaim Retail
The firm establishes and manages hypermarkets and supermarkets, fashion and specialty retail stores.

Hypermarkets and supermarkets 
They partnered with the french Franchise Carrefour in 1995  In June 2017, MAF announced it bought 26 Géant hypermarkets in the UAE, Bahrain and Kuwait. MAF acquired the Géant franchise from BMA International. In February 2018, Egyptians Ministry of Investment and International Cooperation and the National Service Project of the Armed Forces signed a cooperation protocol with Majid Al-Futtaim in the aim to establish 100 Carrefour retail stores in different governorates of Egypt. In December 2018, Majid Al Futtaim announced their plans to rebrand of Hyperstar to Carrefour across Pakistan. A new Carrefour is expected to open in the Mall of Defence in Lahore in early 2019.

The company introduced the world's first sail-through supermarket "Bites and More by the Shore", in December 2018. The supermarket operates off the coast of Dubai in order to cater to customers on yachts, boats and jet skis. In January 2019, Majid Al Futtaim Retail signs a contract with Nshama, a UAE-based developer of master-planned communities, to open a new 8,000 sq ft Carrefour Hypermarket in Town Square Dubai.

In January 2019, speaking at the annual World Economic Forum in Davos, Alain Bejjani (CEO) announced the group’s intention to introduce a Saudi-only workforce in the Carrefour supermarkets across the country. The same year, MAF launched its Retail Business School, which focuses on programmes for employees running its Carrefour operations. Majid al Futtaim currently operates 90 hypermarkets and 120 supermarkets in 15 countries.

In the first half of 2018, Majid Al Futtaim Retail launched its largest regional distribution center in Dubai’s National Industries Park. At an investment of over US$80m, the facility can handle up to 100,000 orders per day.

In 2018, Carrefour is a top 10 popular brand in the UAE according to YouGov.

The company has invested heavily in data analysis and digital capabilities as well as relevant companies and start-ups that serve multiples channels. In December 2017, it launched a School of Analytics and Technology, along with A², its Advanced Analytics Centre of Excellence. The same year, its company signed a Memorandum of Understanding (MoU) with Smart Dubai to help improve the emirate’s data analytics capabilities.

Fashion 
In 2017, Majid Al Futtaim moved into the Home furnishing market with a franchise deal with homeware brand Maisons du Monde.

Partnerships 

 With I.am+: In 2019, MAF became the first retail conglomerate announced as a member of the A.R.C (a coalition of retailers, brands and service providers)/  to provide physical and virtual experiences for multi channel offerings.

Online Shopping 
Kenya : In 2018 the group signed a partnership with online retailer Jumia.
In 2018, the group invested in Wadi, the online delivery portal that operates Wadi Grocery in Saudi Arabia. This is part of a $30 million funding round that will help set up the delivery structure for all Carrefour stores within Saudi-Arabia.

Majid Al Futtaim Ventures
Majid Al Futtaim Ventures is a group of companies that offer amenities such as cinemas, leisure and entertainment, financial services, fashion and healthcare and JVs in facility management and food and beverages. Majid Al Futtaim Ventures is a unit of Majid Al Futtaim (MAF) Group.

Leisure & Entertainment

Majid Al Futtaim Leisure and Entertainment operates Ski Dubai, an indoor ski resort with 22,500 square meters of indoor ski area at the Mall of the Emirates, as well as 18 Magic Planet family entertainment centres. In addition, Magic Planet operates a facility within City Centre Mirdif, a temperature controlled indoor and outdoor water park, and the first Lego store in the Middle East in Abu Dhabi.

 Aquaplay
Ski Dubai: A mountain-themed snow setting at Mall of the Emirates in Dubai.
 Ski Egypt: Introduced in March 2017, it is Africa's first indoor ski slope, situated at Mall of Egypt, in Cairo.
Orbi Dubai: Initially introduced in Yokohama, Japan in 2013 as an experimental visitor attraction, Orbi is an indoor nature experience,  fusings BBC Earth’s   nature content with Sega’s  technology. The first Middle East installation is planned for City Centre Mirdif in the UAE.    
Wahoo! Waterpark: Located at City Centre Bahrain with an area of 15,000 square meters, it is the Middle East’s first  indoor-outdoor waterpark, including Flowrider, the world’s first full size surfing machine at an indoor park.
 iFly Dubai: Indoor skydiving in Dubai. Located at City Centre Mirdif, it allows guests to enjoy the experience of human body flight.
 Little Explorers: Located at City Centre Mirdif, provides education and entertainment for children aged two to seven.
Magic Planet: providesrange of simulator, online and arcade games and rides. First opened at City Centre Deira in 1995, Magic Planet has since grown to 32 locations in the Middle East and Africa.

Family and Retail Entertainment 

Lego stores: In 2015, the group opened the first LEGO-certified store in the MENA region in Yas Mall, Abu Dhabi. In 2016, a LEGO store opened at Mall 360 and The Avenues Mall in Kuwait, the second in the country.
American Girl: In 2017, the group signed an agreement with American Girl, a division of Mattel, and a premium brand for dolls, giving the group  exclusive distribution rights in the UAE, Saudi Arabia, Kuwait, Qatar, Bahrain and Oman. The first American Girl store in the UAE opened in November 2017 at City Centre Mirdif.

Cinemas
The firm has 318 cinema screens in various Middle Eastern countries. Its cinemas in the Mall of the Emirates are considered as the flagship venture with 24 screens – including an IMAX with Laser, VOX 4DX auditorium, a luxury cinema experience called “ThEATre by Rhodes” (collaboration with Michelin Star Chef Gary Rhodes OBE) and VOX Kids. The 100,000sq ft venue became the largest complex in the Middle East after its re-launch in September 28, 2015.

In May 2018,  VOX Cinemas opened the first four-screen multiplex in Saudi Arabia, at the company’s new entertainment complex in Riyadh Park, two weeks after the first public cinema screening in Saudi Arabia for 35 years.

At the end of 2019, VOX Cinemas, part of the Majid Al Futtaim Entertainment group, expects to open a multi-screen venue at the Wafi Mall in Dubai. In January 2019, VOX cinemas opens its doors in Jeddah at the Red Sea Mall.

After decades of cinema ban, Cameron Mitchell, CEO of Majid Al Futtaim Cinemas, said that MAF is contributing to the Saudi Vision 2030, and the group announces in January 2019 VOX's rollout of 300 new screens in the Kingdom within 18 months as part of a $4 billion investment plan.

Restaurants and Cafés 
In 2013, the group  established a joint venture agreement with Gourmet Gulf, a food and beverage retail company.  Majid Al Futtaim now co-owns the development and franchise rights to food brands such as Dalloyau, California Pizza Kitchen, YO! Sushi, Texas de Brazil, in more than 20 food and beverage outlets in the region.

Financial Services 
In 2018, the group acquired Beam Portal, a Dubai-based mobile payments provider.

Energy 
Previously "MAF Dalkia" (a partnership between Majid Al Futtaim Ventures and Dalkia). In 2015, MAF Dalkia Middle East rebranded its identity under the name of ‘Enova’, (a joint venture company  between Majid Al Futtaim and Veolia).

See also
 Majid Al Futtaim
 Al-Futtaim Group
 Mall of the Emirates
 Emaar Group
 Daemaar Group
 Al Ghurair Group

References

External links

Companies based in Dubai